KGHB-CD, virtual channel 27 (UHF digital channel 21), is a low-powered, Class A UniMás-affiliated television station licensed to Pueblo, Colorado, United States. Owned by Entravision Communications, it is a sister station to Univision affiliate KVSN-DT (channel 48, also licensed to Pueblo). KGHB-CD's transmitter is located on Baculite Mesa north of Pueblo.

Even though KGHB broadcasts a digital signal of its own, its broadcast radius just barely reaches Colorado Springs. The station is therefore simulcast on KVSN's second digital subchannel in order to cover the entire market. This can be seen on virtual channel 48.2 (UHF channel 27.2) from a transmitter on Cheyenne Mountain.

On cable, KGHB is available on Comcast Xfinity channel 11 (CBS affiliate KKTV, which broadcasts over the air on channel 11, is instead carried on channel 10).

External links 
Entravision official site

UniMás network affiliates
GHB-CD
Television channels and stations established in 1990
1990 establishments in Colorado
GHB-CD
Low-power television stations in the United States